The SAT is a standardized college admissions test in the United States.

SAT or Sat may also refer to:

Aviation
 SAT Airlines, a Russian airline based in Sakhalin
 SATS (company), a catering service provider at Singapore Changi Airport
 Special Air Transport or Germania, a German airline
 Static air temperature, the temperature of the air around an aircraft
 San Antonio International Airport's IATA code

Government and military
 Sat (Romania), a unit in Romania County administration
 Servicio de Administración Tributaria, Mexico's Tax Administration Service
 Special Assault Team, a counter-terrorist unit of the National Police Agency of Japan
 State Administration of Taxation, China's internal revenue service
 State Administrative Tribunal of Western Australia, an independent body that makes and reviews a range of administrative decisions
 Su Altı Taarruz, Turkish special naval attack commandos

Language
 Sat (letter), a letter in the Ge'ez alphabet
 Sat (Sanskrit), a word in Sanskrit meaning "the true essence (nature)"
 Santali language's ISO 639-3 language code

People
 Sat (rapper) (born 1975), French rapper
 Sat, a pen name used by cartoonist Bob Satterfield

Science, mathematics, and technology
 SCSI / ATA Translation, a computer device communications standard
 Site acceptance test, in engineering
 Surface air temperature, in meteorology
 Blood oxygen saturation, known as "sats"
 Boolean satisfiability problem (SAT, 2-SAT, 3-SAT)
 .SAT, a file extension for ACIS CAD files

Transport
 South Acton railway station (England), London, England, National Rail station code

Other uses
 National Curriculum assessment, sometimes referred to as standard attainment tests, is a series of educational assessments in the United Kingdom
 Sennacieca Asocio Tutmonda or World Non-national Association, a worldwide association of leftist Esperanto-speakers
 The S.A.T., a professional wrestling tag-team
 Subtle Asian Traits, a Facebook group
 Sat, Jilu, a historical Assyrian hamlet in the Jilu district in the Hakkari region of what is now Turkey
 Saturday is commonly abbreviated to Sat

See also
 Sat.1, a German television channel
 SAT 10, the Stanford Achievement Test Series, tests assessing knowledge of school pupils in the United States
 SAT Subject Tests or SAT II, standardized tests given by The College Board on individual subjects for United States college admissions
 SAT solver, an algorithm for solving Boolean satisfiability problems
 SATS (disambiguation)
 Saturation (disambiguation)